In Greek mythology, Aenius (Ancient Greek: Αἴνιον) was a Paeonian soldier who participated in the siege of Troy. He sided with the Trojans during the Trojan War and was killed by the hero Achilles.

Note

References 

 Homer, The Iliad with an English Translation by A.T. Murray, Ph.D. in two volumes. Cambridge, MA., Harvard University Press; London, William Heinemann, Ltd. 1924. Online version at the Perseus Digital Library.
 Homer. Homeri Opera in five volumes. Oxford, Oxford University Press. 1920. Greek text available at the Perseus Digital Library.

Characters in Greek mythology